The 2016–17 French Guiana Honor Division was the 56th season of the French Guiana Division d'Honneur, the top tier of football in French Guiana. The season began on 15 September 2016, with Remire taking a 3–0 win over Kouroucien. The final game of the regular season was on 19 March 2017 with Cayenne beating Grand Santi, 1–0. 

Matoury entered the season as the defending champions, and were successfully able to defend their title.

Teams 

There were 12 clubs that competed during the season.

Table 

Note: various clubs have points deducted, mostly due to forfeiting matches

References

External links 
League Website

2016–17
2016–17 in Caribbean football leagues
1